Robert Walden (born Robert Wolkowitz; September 25, 1943) is an American television and motion picture actor. He is best known for his role as Joe Rossi on Lou Grant, which earned him three Primetime Emmy Awards for Outstanding Supporting Actor in a Drama Series nominations; for his role as Joe Waters on Brothers; and as Glenn Newman on Happily Divorced. Walden is also well known for his roles in the films  Blue Sunshine, The Hospital, All the President's Men, Audrey Rose, and Capricorn One.

Life and career
Walden was born in New York City, the son of Hilda (née Winokur) and Max Wolkowitz. His nephew is director Howard Deutch, the son of his sister; and his grand-nieces are actresses Zoey Deutch and Madelyn Deutch. Walden first became interested in acting while attending City College of New York, and shortly thereafter became a member of the Actors Studio.

Walden's film career began in 1970, in Bloody Mama for Roger Corman. After that, and for the first several years of his career, he often played young doctors, such as in the television series The New Doctors (one of the rotating elements of NBC's The Bold Ones) as Dr. Cohen, after the departure of John Saxon prior to the final season; and notably in films Blue Sunshine and Paddy Chayefsky's The Hospital. His breakthrough role was in the television series Lou Grant, on which he played journalist Joe Rossi. He was a cast member on Lou Grant during its entire run (1977–1982), and received three Emmy Award nominations (in 1979, 1980 and 1981) for Outstanding Supporting Actor in a Drama Series for the role. Walden has played several historical characters, including Donald Segretti in the 1976 film All the President's Men, and J. Robert Oppenheimer in the 1980 TV movie Enola Gay: The Men, the Mission, the Atomic Bomb. From 1984 until 1989, he starred in the groundbreaking Showtime sitcom Brothers as the middle of three brothers, the owner of a bar/restaurant who was a retired NFL placekicker. His youngest brother, played by Paul Regina, was gay and the series dealt with issues regarding homosexuality. Walden also made a cameo appearance as a sound engineer in the 1994 film Radioland Murders.

In 2011, Walden made a return to series television in the TV Land sitcom Happily Divorced, playing Glenn Newman, the father of the lead character played by series creator and writer Fran Drescher, with Rita Moreno co-starring as his wife. As on his previous series Brothers, Happily Divorced is also predominantly gay-themed, as the plot is based on Drescher's divorce from series co-creator Peter Marc Jacobson, who later revealed he was gay and remained friends with Drescher. The series was cancelled in 2013 after two seasons.

Other work
He was a member of the Doo Wop group Bobby & The Chord-A-Roys in 1960.

Walden is a distinguished teacher of acting at The New School for Drama, division of the New York City university The New School. In August, 2006 he appeared in the Herbert Berghof Playwrights Foundation (HB Studio) production of Arthur Miller's The American Clock under the direction of Austin Pendleton. Walden also appeared in the movie Capricorn One (1978) as Elliot Whitter.

Selected filmography

Television series

References

External links

1943 births
Living people
20th-century American Jews
American male film actors
Actors Studio alumni
American male television actors
City College of New York alumni
Male actors from New York City
20th-century American male actors
21st-century American male actors
21st-century American Jews